The 2012–13 All-Ireland Junior Club Hurling Championship was the 10th staging of the All-Ireland Junior Club Hurling Championship since its establishment by the Gaelic Athletic Association. The championship began on 29 September 2012 and ended on 10 February 2013.

On 10 February 2013, Thomastown won the championship following a 2–17 to 2–14 defeat of Fullen Gaels in the final at Croke Park.

Thomastown's Michael Donnelly was the championship's top scorer with 0-40.

Connacht Junior Club Hurling Championship

Connacht semi-final

Connacht final

Leinster Junior Club Hurling Championship

Leinster first round

Leinster quarter-finals

Leinster semi-finals

Leinster final

Munster Junior Club Hurling Championship

Munster quarter-final

Munster semi-finals

Munster final

Ulster Junior Club Hurling Championship

Ulster preliminary round

Ulster quarter-finals

Ulster semi-finals

Ulster final

All-Ireland Junior Club Hurling Championship

=All-Ireland quarter-final

All-Ireland semi-finals

All-Ireland final

References

All-Ireland Junior Club Hurling Championship
All-Ireland Junior Club Hurling Championship
All-Ireland Junior Club Hurling Championship